The Loyginskaya narrow-gauge railway is located in Arkhangelsk Oblast and Vologda Oblast, Russia. The railway is a  narrow-gauge railway and it operates year-round.

Current status 
The Loyginskaya forestry railway first line was built in 1947, in the area of Ustyansky District, Arkhangelsk Oblast, starting from the village of Loyga. The railway operates a scheduled freight services from Loyga, and is used for transportation of felled logs and forestry workers. In 2014 a railway bridge was built over the river Porsha.

Rolling stock

Locomotives 
 TU6D – No. 0214
 TU6P – No. 0002
 TU6A – Nos. 2541, 2621, 2992, 3767, 3897
 TU7A – Nos. 1361, 1497, 3229, 3151
 TU8 – Nos. 0071, 0060, 0408, 0541, 0542

Railroad cars 
Boxcar
Tank car
Snowplow
Passenger car
DM-20 "Fiskars"
 Railway log-car and flatcar
Hopper car to transport track ballast

Gallery

References and sources

See also
Narrow-gauge railways in Russia

External links

 Official website JSC Company group "Vologodskiye lesopromyshlenniki"
 Official JSC Company group "Vologodskiye lesopromyshlenniki" at the VKontakte  
 Photo - project "Steam Engine" 
 Loyginskaya railway (interactive map)

750 mm gauge railways in Russia
Railway lines opened in 1947
Rail transport in Arkhangelsk Oblast
Logging railways in Russia